Stephan Mögle-Stadel, born 21 December 1965, is a German educator, journalist and book writer.

Together with Troy Davis, he is the chairman of a world citizenship group, of which he is the Founder and President and the author of the 'Dag Hammarskjöld: Vision einer Menschheitsethik' (Vision from a Human Ethic).

Background 

He studied education, psychology, and history, partly at the C.G. Jung Institute for Depth Psychology, and he is a member of the Erich Fromm Society for Social Psychology. He trained as a journalist in the Axel Springer company and at the "Akademie für Publizistik" in Hamburg. After this he wrote as an independent journalist for different newspapers. In 1990 he became a correspondent at the United Nations in New York City. In 1992, while he did his alternative national service as a conscientious objector, he took part in a UN internship programme. In 1998 he took part as a journalist and NGO representative at the Berlin Conference for World Climate Change and in 1993 at the Preparation Conference for the World Summit in Rio. As a travel journalist he reported from Egypt, Israel, India, Japan and the USA. After that he worked within the range of human rights and globalization questions for non-governmental organizations and since 1998 he has been an honorary member of the board of the World Citizen Foundation New York.

He has written and published several books on globalization, human rights, united nations, governance, futurology, and psychohistory. His first book, the occult-Nazi thriller Die Schwarze Sonne von Tashi Lhunpo, was published in 1991 under the pen-name Russell McCloud. He was also the Editor of Boutros Boutros Ghali's book UNorganisierte Welt.

Publications 
 Boutros Boutros-Ghali (Hrsg. Stephan Mögle-Stadel): UNorganisierte Welt: die Reform der Vereinten Nationen. Horizonte Verlag, Stuttgart 1993, 
 Kofi A. Annan (Coauthor u. Hrsg. Stephan Mögle-Stadel): UNvollendeter Weg : die UNO im 21. Jahrhundert. Verl. Dt. Unitarier, Hamburg 2003. 190 S. 
 Menschheit an der Schwelle - Globalisierungskrise und Weltwirtschaftsdiktatur. Urachhaus, Stuttgart 2003. 224 S. 
 Dag Hammarskjöld - Vision einer Menschheitsethik. Urachhaus, Stuttgart 1999. 252 S. 
 Unorganized World - the Chances of Globalization (1998), Universität Münster, Forum Oeconomicum
 Die Unteilbarkeit der Erde. Globale Krise, Weltbürgertum und Weltförderation : eine Antwort an den Club of Rome. Bouvier Verlag, Bonn 1996. 240 S. 
 Ossip K. Flechtheim (CoAutor u. Hrsg. Stephan Mögle-Stadel): Ist die Zukunft noch zu retten. Peter Lang, Frankfurt am Main, Bern 1995. 
 Dag Hammarskjölds Vermächtnis - Ich und Du, Mensch und Menschheit. Amthor Verlag, Heidenheim 2005,

References

External links 
 
 Biography of Stephan Mögle-Stadel
 Journalist Mögle-Stadel zu Dag Hammarskjöld
 www.hammarskjoeld.org
 southerncrossreview.org
 www.weltdemokratie.de
 www.welt-buerger.org

Living people
1965 births
German journalists
German male journalists
German male writers